This is the discography of American soul singer Otis Redding.

Studio albums

Posthumous studio albums
Otis Redding's death prompted a number of releases, including live albums and compilations. Four albums of mostly new material were released, but they are more like compilations than official studio releases.

The first of these releases, The Dock of the Bay, assembled by guitarist and producer Steve Cropper, is made up of previously released singles and b-sides as well as some album tracks and a few previously unissued recordings. The other three of these albums contain a greater amount of previously unreleased material. The posthumous collections are generally considered to be of good quality, which is unusual, as many posthumous releases by other artists receive unfavorable reviews.

A fifth release, Remember Me, came out on 20 March 1992, featuring 22 unreleased tracks taken from Redding's 1963–1967 recordings, with numerous unreleased and stereo recordings. Two alternate takes of "(Sittin' on) The Dock of the Bay" and alternate takes of other famous tracks, such as "Respect", "Come to Me", and Try a Little Tenderness, are among its highlights.

Live albums
Officially released live recordings by Otis Redding primarily come from three sources: a series of shows performed at the Whisky a Go Go in April 1966, the Stax/Volt Revue tour of Europe in March and April 1967, and his five-song set at the Monterey International Pop Festival on June 17, 1967.

Earlier live performances of "Pain in My Heart" and "These Arms of Mine" from November 16, 1963, were officially released on the Atco compilation album Apollo Saturday Night in 1964. These two performances are also included in the 1993 box set Otis! The Definitive Otis Redding.

Compilation albums

Charted compilations

Other compilations
 Soul as Sung by Otis Redding and Little Joe Curtis (1968, Alshire Presents)
 Ten Years Gone (1977, Atlantic; Japan-only 3-LP compilation)
 The Ultimate Otis Redding (1986, Warner Bros.)
 The Otis Redding Story (1987, Atlantic)
 Remember Me (1992, Stax)
 Otis! The Definitive Otis Redding (1993, Rhino)
 The Very Best of Otis Redding, Vol. 2 (1995, Rhino)
 I've Been Loving You Too Long and Other Hits (1997, Rhino/Flashback). RIAA: Gold
 Love Songs (1998, Rhino). BPI: Silver
 Stax Profiles (2006, Stax)
 The Definitive Soul Collection (2006, Rhino). BPI: Silver
 The Best: See & Hear, Otis Redding (2009, Shout! Factory)
 Soul Legend - The Best of Otis Redding (2011, Music Club Deluxe/MCI)
 Lonely & Blue - The Deepest Soul of Otis Redding (2013, Stax)
 The Complete Stax/Volt Singles Collection (2013, Shout! Factory)
 Soul Manifesto: 1964-1970 (2015, Rhino)

Singles

Posthumous singles

As featured artist

References

External Links
 

Discographies of American artists
Blues discographies
Rhythm and blues discographies